Harry Rouse (born 20 October 1993) is an English cricketer. He is a right-handed batsman and a right-arm fast medium bowler and has represented Leeds/Bradford MCC University in first-class cricket. He made his first-class debut for Leeds/Bradford MCCU against Yorkshire on 5 April 2013.

References

External links

1993 births
Living people
English cricketers
Leeds/Bradford MCCU cricketers